The 1987 National Rowing Championships was the 16th edition of the National Championships, held from 17–19 July 1987 at the National Water Sports Centre in Holme Pierrepont, Nottingham.

Senior

Medal summary

Lightweight

Medal summary

Junior

Medal summary

Coastal

Medal summary 

Key

References 

British Rowing Championships
British Rowing Championships
British Rowing Championships